The Reksa Artha Museum is a history museum located in Jakarta, Indonesia.

The museum has a collection of historic items related to the printing of Indonesian rupiah. Some of its collection are historic Rupiah banknotes from the independence period until the Orde Baru era, 20th century money printers, coin making tools and historic pictures about the ORI (Oeang Republic of Indonesia) which in the past was used to maintain economic sovereignty in the early independence.

The building of the museum was originally an ink warehouse of Perum Peruri.

Museum Reksa Artha is one of the many museums in Indonesia with low number of visitors. The museum is often closed and so appointments should be made before visiting the museum.

See also
List of museums and cultural institutions in Indonesia

References

History museums in Indonesia
Indonesian rupiah
Indonesian rupiah
Rupiah
Museums in Jakarta